The 1969 NCAA College Division basketball tournament involved 32 schools playing in a single-elimination tournament to determine the national champion of men's NCAA College Division college basketball as a culmination of the 1968–69 NCAA College Division men's basketball season. It was won by Kentucky Wesleyan College, with Kentucky Wesleyan's George Tinsley named the Most Outstanding Player.

American International College's tournament and semifinal appearances were later vacated due to NCAA rules violations.

Regional participants

*tournament appearance vacated

Regionals

South Atlantic - Norfolk, Virginia
Location: unknown Host: Norfolk State University

Third Place - Norfolk State 113, Old Dominion 102

South - Owensboro, Kentucky
Location: Owensboro Sportscenter Host: Kentucky Wesleyan College

Third Place - Transylvania 65, Bellarmine 64

Far West - Las Vegas, Nevada
Location: Las Vegas Convention Center Host: University of Nevada, Las Vegas

Third Place -UC Irvine 82, UC Davis 70

New England - Springfield, Massachusetts
Location: Butova Gymnasium Host: American International College

Third Place - Assumption 98, Central Connecticut State 77

East - Syracuse, New York
Location: Henninger Athletic Center Host: LeMoyne College

Third Place - Albany 71, Le Moyne 70

Midwest - Springfield, Missouri
Location: McDonald Hall and Arena Host: Southwest Missouri State University

Third Place - Lincoln 77, St. Olaf 72

Great Lakes - Valparaiso, Indiana
Location: Hilltop Gym  Host: Valparaiso University

Third Place - North Park 90, Concordia 73

Mideast - Ashland, Ohio
Location: Kates Gymnasium Host: Ashland University

Third Place - Philadelphia Textile 76, Wittenberg 74

*denotes each overtime played

National Finals - Evansville, Indiana
Location: Roberts Municipal Stadium Host: University of Evansville

Third Place - American International 53, Ashland 51

*denotes each overtime played

All-Tournament team
 Mert Bancroft (Southwest Missouri State)
 Tommy Hobgood (Kentucky Wesleyan)
 Curtis Perry (Southwest Missouri State)
 Bob Rutherford (American International)
 George Tinsley (Kentucky Wesleyan)

See also
 1969 NCAA University Division basketball tournament
 1969 NAIA Basketball Tournament

References

Sources
 2010 NCAA Men's Basketball Championship Tournament Records and Statistics: Division II men's basketball Championship
 1969 NCAA College Division Men's Basketball Tournament jonfmorse.com

NCAA Division II men's basketball tournament
Tournament
NCAA College Division basketball tournament
NCAA College Division basketball tournament